Eznaveleh (also Romanized as Eznāveleh, Aznāvleh, and Eznāvleh) is a village in Muzaran Rural District, in the Central District of Malayer County, Hamadan Province, Iran. At the 2006 census, its population was 648, in 181 families.

References 

Populated places in Malayer County